Lena Janet Yvonne Ågren (born 6 April 1949) is a Swedish former actress and model. She starred primarily in Italian exploitation films.

Life and career 
Ågren was born in Landskrona, Sweden, a town she once described to Italian entertainment journalists as a "Northern Naples". Her modeling career brought her to Rome where she studied acting at the Drama School directed by Alessandro Fersen. She made her film debut in Luciano Salce's Colpo di stato, and her early roles included the Michael Caine film Pulp (1972) as a receptionist, and the Jack Lemmon comedy Avanti! (1972) as a nurse. She appeared in 57 films, including The Left Hand of the Law (1975), Lucio Fulci's City of the Living Dead (1980), Umberto Lenzi's Eaten Alive! (1980), Panic (1982), Red Sonja (1985), the Bud Spencer comedy Aladin (1986) and the cult horror film Ratman (1988). In the early 1980s she also had a brief musical career.

She quit acting in the early 1990s and moved to the US where she currently resides. She married the Italian film producer Carlo Maietto.

Selected filmography 

Donne... botte e bersaglieri (1968) – Rika
The Two Crusaders (1968) – Clorinda
Normal Young Man (1969) – Diana
One on Top of the Other (1969)  – Girl looking for Neurosedyl (uncredited)
Pussycat, Pussycat, I Love You (1970) – (uncredited)
Du soleil plein les yeux (1970) – Monica
Io non spezzo... rompo (1971) – Carla Viganò
Io non vedo, tu non parli, lui non sente (1971) – Monica Gorletti
Pulp (1972) – Publisher's Receptionist
Life Is Tough, Eh Providence? (1972) – Stella
Avanti! (1972) – Nurse
The Most Wonderful Evening of My Life (1972) – Simonetta
Racconti proibiti... di niente vestiti (1972) – Maddalena
Fiorina la vacca (1972) – Tazia
Tecnica di un amore (1973) – Monica
Ingrid sulla strada (1973) – Ingrid
The Killer Reserved Nine Seats (1974) – Kim
The Profiteer (1974) – Teresa Adiutori
L'erotomane (1974) – Ciccia Persichetti
Paolo Barca, Schoolteacher and Weekend Nudist (1975) – Giulia Hamilton
The Left Hand of the Law (1975) – Gloria
Sensualidad (1975) – María José
Chi dice donna dice donna (1976) – Anita (segment "Ma non ci sposano")
Vai col liscio (1976) – Celeste
Per amore (1976) – Daniela Rovati
Stato interessante (1977) – Carla (first story)
Bermuda: Cave of the Sharks (1978) – Angelica
The Uranium Conspiracy (1978) – Helga
The Perfect Crime (1978) – Lady Gloria Boyd
Deadly Chase (1978) – Giulia Medici
The Iron Commissioner (1978) – Vera
Lobster for Breakfast (1979) – Monique Dubois
7 ragazze di classe (1979) – Laura
Maria – Nur die Nacht war ihr Zeuge (1980) – Maria
Eaten Alive! (1980) – Sheila Morris
City of the Living Dead (1980) – Sandra
Prestami tua moglie (1980) – Ingrid Nillsen
L'onorevole con l'amante sotto il letto (1981) – Anna Vinci
La gatta da pelare (1981) – Margaret
Don't Play with Tigers (1982) – Frau Kuppler
Sogni mostruosamente proibiti (1982) – Dalia
Panic (1982) – Jane Blake
L'inceneritore (1982)
Dagger Eyes (1983) – Pamela
Occhio, malocchio, prezzemolo e finocchio (1983) – Helen
Questo e Quello (1983) – Lucilla (segment "Questo... amore impossibile")
Vediamoci chiaro (1984) – Geneviève
Red Sonja (1985) – Varna
Hands of Steel (1986) – Linda
Aladin (1986) – Janet Haddin
Karate Warrior (1987) – Julia Scott
Night of the Sharks (1988) – Liz Ziegler
Ratman (1988) – Terry
Magdalene (1988) – Anna
Per sempre (1991) – Eleonora Rondi (final film role)

References

External links 

 
 National Library of Sweden Catalog – Janet Ågren

1949 births
Living people
People from Landskrona Municipality
Swedish film actresses
Swedish expatriates in the United States